Kim Hyun-ji (born 4 November 1993) is a South Korean field hockey player. She competed for the South Korea women's national field hockey team at the 2016 Summer Olympics.

She won a gold medal as a member of the South Korean team at 2014 Asian Games.

References

1993 births
Living people
South Korean female field hockey players
Asian Games medalists in field hockey
Asian Games gold medalists for South Korea
Field hockey players at the 2014 Asian Games
Field hockey players at the 2016 Summer Olympics
Medalists at the 2014 Asian Games
Olympic field hockey players of South Korea
21st-century South Korean women